Earth is a planet in the Solar System, and the third planet from the Sun. Earth is called The World in geopolitical contexts.

Earth may also refer to:

Elements
Earth (classical element), one of the four Greek classical elements
Earth (Wu Xing), one of the Wu Xing (elements in traditional Chinese philosophy)

Science 
Earth (historical chemistry), a class of elements or compounds
Earth (electricity) or ground, used as a zero potential reference
Land or earth, the solid terrestrial surface of the planet
Soil or earth, the material in which plants grow

Places
Earth, Texas, a small town in the United States
Earth City, Missouri, an unincorporated community in the United States

People with the name
Chief Earth Woman, Ojibwa chief
Trembling Earth, Yankton Sioux chief

Animals
 Earth, a group of foxes
Earth, a captive orca at Kamogawa SeaWorld

Arts, entertainment, and media

Films 
Earth (1930 film), a Soviet film by Alexander Dovzhenko
Earth (1947 film), an Austrian-Swiss film
Earth (1957 film), a Bulgarian film
Earth (1996 film), a Spanish film by Julio Medem
Earth (1998 film), an Indo-Canadian film by Deepa Mehta
 Earth (2007 film), a documentary produced by the BBC Natural History Unit
The Earth (1921 film), a French film by André Antoine, based on the novel by Émile Zola
The Earth (1974 film), or The Land, a South Korean film
The Earth (2006 film), or Our Land, an Italian film

Literature 
Earth (Brin novel), a 1990 science fiction novel by David Brin
Earth (The Book), a 2010 non-fiction book by Jon Stewart, et al.
La Terre or The Earth, an 1887 novel by Émile Zola
Earth, a planet in Issac Asimov's Foundation series
The Earth, a non-fiction book by Isaac Asimov

Music

Groups
Earth (American band), a drone metal band
Earth (British band), a band formed by Glenn Ross Campbell of The Misunderstood 
Earth (Japanese band), a J-pop group
Earth, the original band of Bruce Springsteen
Black Sabbath, or Earth

Albums
Earth (EP), EP by Elitist (2011)
Earth (Jefferson Starship album) (1978)
Earth (Matthew Sweet album) (1989)
Earth (Vangelis album) (1973)
Earth (Neil Young and Promise of the Real album) (2016)
Earth (EOB album) (2020)
Earth (Sault album) (2022)

Songs
"Earth" (song), a 2019 song by Lil Dicky
"EARTH", a song by Susumu Hirasawa from the 1997 Sword-Wind Chronicle BERSERK Original Soundtrack
"Earth", a song by Smile
"Earth", a song by Way Out West from the 1997 album Way Out West
"Earth Song", a 1995 song by Michael Jackson

Television
Earth: Final Conflict, a science fiction television series
Earth 2 (TV series), a science fiction TV series
Avatar: The Last Airbender (season 2) or Earth

Other uses in arts, entertainment, and media
 Earth, a character in Konjiki no Gash Bell!
Earth in science fiction

Other uses
Earth Group, a former Croatian fine arts collective
Google Earth, interactive view of the earth, made by Google
Minecraft Earth, sandbox video game
Miss Earth, a beauty contest
Mother Earth (disambiguation)

See also 

Eartha, the world's largest rotating globe
Gaia (disambiguation)
Planet Earth (disambiguation)
Terra (disambiguation)
Whole Earth (disambiguation) 
World (disambiguation)